Samuel D. Pollard is an American film director, editor, producer, and screenwriter. His films have garnered numerous awards such as Peabodys, Emmys, and an Academy Award nomination. In 2020, the International Documentary Association gave him a career achievement award. Spike Lee, whose films Pollard has edited and produced, described him as being "a master filmmaker." Henry Louis Gates Jr. characterizes his work in this way: "When I think about his documentaries, they add up to a corpus — a way of telling African-American history in its various dimensions."

Career 
Born in Harlem, New York, Samuel D. Pollard began his career in 1972 as an editor for Victor Kanefsky, after having taken courses in a workshop organized by WNET. He obtained a BA from Baruch College in 1973. Early in his career, he assisted George Bowers, the editor of A League of Their Own, The Good Son and The Stepfather. St. Clair Bourne was also a mentor.

Awards and recognition 
In 1998, Pollard received an Academy Award nomination for 4 Little Girls with Spike Lee. In 2010, Pollard (with Geeta Gandbhir and Arielle Amsalem) received an Emmy Award (Outstanding Picture Editing for Nonfiction Programming) for the film By the People: The Election of Barack Obama. In 2020, the International Documentary Association gave Pollard its first Career Achievement Award.

MLK/FBI was named best documentary at the 2020 San Diego International Film Festival.

In 2021, Film at Lincoln Center put together Tribute to Sam Pollard, featuring several of his documentaries, calling him one of "cinema’s most dedicated chroniclers of the Black experience in America."

Filmography

As director 

 1990 – Eyes on the Prize, (2 episodes) documentary.
 2016 – Two Trains Runnin'''
 2017 – Maynard 2018 – Mr. Soul!, documentary.
 2020 – MLK/FBI, documentary.
 2021 – Black Art: In the Absence of Light, documentary.
 2021 - Citizen Ashe, documentary.
 2022 - Lowndes County and the Road to Black Power, documentary (with Geeta Gandbhir)

 As editor 

 1973 – Ganja and Hess 1978 – Just Crazy About Horses, documentary.
 1981 – Night of the Zombies.
 1981 – Body and Soul, directed by George Bowers.
 1983 – Style Wars 1984 – Smithsonian World, television series.
 1984 – Style Wars, documentary.
 1985 – Private Resort, directed by George Bowers.
 1985 – Tornado!.
 1985 – Nova, television documentary series.
 1987 – Distant Harmony, documentary.
 1988 – Depression, documentary.
 1990 – Mo' Better Blues, directed by Spike Lee.
 1991 – Jungle Fever, directed by Spike Lee.
 1992 – Juice.
 1993 – Fires in the Mirror, directed by George C. Wolfe, play written by Anna Deavere Smith.
 1994 – Surviving the Game.
 1994 – No Dreams Deferred.
 1995 – Clockers, directed by Spike Lee.
 1996 – Girl 6, directed by Spike Lee.
 1997 – 4 Little Girls, documentary.
 2000 – Bamboozled, directed by Spike Lee
 2000 – The Very Black Show.
 2000 – Half Past Autumn: The Life and Works of Gordon Parks, documentary.
 2002 – Hookers at the Point, documentary.
 2004 – Chisholm '72: Unbought & Unbossed, documentary.
 2004 – Isn't This a Time! A Tribute Concert for Harold Leventhal, documentary.
 2005 – Twelve Disciples of Nelson Mandela, documentary.
 2006 – Katrina, documentary.
 2007 – Pete Seeger: The Power of Song, documentary.
 2009 – By the People: The Election of Barack Obama, documentary.
 2010 – Gerrymandering, documentary.
 2010 – Joe Papp in Five Acts, documentary.
 2010 – If God Is Willing and da Creek Don't Rise, documentary series.

 References 

External links
 
 Bill Desowitz, "Collaboration: Editor Sam Pollard", Below the Line'', December 1, 2003

African-American film directors
American film editors
American filmmakers
American producers
Year of birth missing (living people)
Living people
Baruch College alumni
21st-century African-American people